The Connecticut Open was a professional tennis tournament played on outdoor hard courts. It was a WTA Premier Tournament on the WTA Tour until its final edition in 2018. From 2005 through 2010 the tournament was also part of the ATP World Tour 250 series of the ATP Tour. It was held annually at the Cullman-Heyman Tennis Center in New Haven, Connecticut, United States, just before the fourth and last Grand Slam tournament of the year, the US Open. In 2019, the tournament sanction was sold to APG, a sports and entertainment company, which transferred it to Zhengzhou, China.

History
The tournament was created in 1948 as the U.S. Women's Hardcourt Championships and first played in Sacramento, California, in the United States. Over the 20 years of its first run the event was moved to several U.S. locations including San Francisco; Berkeley, California; Salt Lake City, Utah; Seattle, Washington; La Jolla, San Diego, California; and Denver, Colorado. Among the winners of the event were Doris Hart, Darlene Hard, Nancy Richey, Rosemary Casals, Billie Jean King, and Jane Bartkowicz. The event was discontinued in 1969 after the beginning of the Open Era.

In 1988, the United States Tennis Association (USTA) reinstated the tournament. The first edition of the new U.S. Women's Hardcourt Championships were held that year in San Antonio, Texas, first as part of Tier IV of the WTA Tour, then as an upgraded Tier III event in 1990. The championships were first sponsored by Post Cereals in 1990 and by Acura from 1992 to 1994. Over the first years of its second run, the tournament was won by several past or future World No. 1s, including Steffi Graf, Monica Seles, and Martina Navratilova. After the event was moved to Stratton Mountain, Vermont, for the 1993 and 1994 editions, conflicts with the 1996 Summer Olympics prevented the tournament from being held in 1995 and 1996. In 1997, the event returned again, now within Tier II and first in Stone Mountain, Georgia, then settling in 1998 in New Haven, Connecticut, under the new sponsorship of Pilot Pen. In the first years of its run in New Haven, the Pilot Pen International saw its competition dominated by Lindsay Davenport (four-time runner-up in New Haven, one previous time in Stone Mountain, and 2005 champion) and Venus Williams (four-time champion from 1999 to 2002).

New Haven was already host to a men's tournament, Pilot Pen International. It was created in 1973 in Bretton Woods, New Hampshire, as the Volvo International, and moved to Connecticut in 1990, where it took Pilot Pen sponsorship in 1997. When the men's event was cancelled in 1999, the women's Pilot Pen tournament remained the only one of the region.

In 2005, the USTA purchased the men's tournament of Long Island, New York, and merged it with the women's Pilot Pen International to create Pilot Pen Tennis, the first large joint ATP–WTA tournament leading to the US Open. The tournament became the last event of the US Open Series and continued to attract top players, including champions Caroline Wozniacki, Svetlana Kuznetsova, James Blake, Justine Henin, and Nikolay Davydenko.

In 2011, the men's competition moved to Winston-Salem; the women's-only event was renamed the New Haven Open at Yale. In 2014, it was renamed the Connecticut Open.

In 2019, the Connecticut Open ended due to a lack of funding. The tournament's sanction was sold and assigned to Zhengzhou, China following the 2019 US Open.

Past finals

Women's singles

 From 1948 through 1950, the U.S. Women's Hardcourt Championships were a combined event with the Pacific Coast Championships.

Women's doubles

Men's singles

Men's doubles

2011 earthquake
On August 23, 2011, 1:51 PM local time a 5.8 magnitude earthquake in Virginia stopped play for two hours while the main stadium was checked for damage by the fire department.

See also
Volvo International

References

External links
Official website
ATP tournament profile (New Haven)
ATP tournament profile (Long Island)
sonyericssonwtatour.com profile (New Haven years)

 
Hard court tennis tournaments in the United States
ATP Tour
WTA Tour
Tennis in Connecticut
US Open Series
Recurring sporting events established in 1948
Recurring sporting events disestablished in 2019
Defunct tennis tournaments in the United States
Sports competitions in Connecticut